Paulin Nkombe Tokala (born March 26, 1977 in Kinshasa) is a retired DR Congolese footballer who played as a goalkeeper.

International career
He was part of the Congolese team for the 1998, 2000, 2002 and 2004 African Nations Cup.

External links

1977 births
Living people
Footballers from Kinshasa
Democratic Republic of the Congo footballers
Democratic Republic of the Congo international footballers
1998 African Cup of Nations players
2002 African Cup of Nations players
2004 African Cup of Nations players
AS Vita Club players
G.D. Interclube players
C.D. Primeiro de Agosto players
S.L. Benfica (Luanda) players
FC 105 Libreville players
AS Mangasport players
Association football goalkeepers
Democratic Republic of the Congo expatriate footballers
Expatriate footballers in Angola
Democratic Republic of the Congo expatriate sportspeople in Angola
Expatriate footballers in Gabon
Democratic Republic of the Congo expatriate sportspeople in Gabon